A vaccine passport or proof of vaccination is an immunity passport employed as a credential in countries and jurisdictions as part of efforts to control the COVID-19 pandemic via vaccination. A vaccine passport is typically issued by a government or health authority, and usually consists of a digital or printed record. Some credentials may include a scannable QR code, which can also be provisioned via mobile app. It may or may not use a COVID-19 vaccine card as a basis of authentication.

The use of vaccine passports is based on the general presumption that a vaccinated individual would be less likely to transmit SARS-CoV-2 to others, and less likely to experience a severe outcome (hospitalization or death) if they were to be infected, thus making it relatively safer for them to congregate. A vaccine passport is typically coordinated with policies enforced by individual businesses, or enforceable public health orders, that require patrons to present proof of vaccination for COVID-19 as a condition of entry or service.

Government-mandated use of vaccine passports typically applies to discretionary public spaces and events (such as indoor restaurants, bars, or large-scale in-person events, such as concerts and sports), and not essential businesses, such as retail stores or health care. In France, Italy, Ireland, and Canada, vaccine uptake increased after various levels of governments announced plans to introduce vaccine passports. An intention by some jurisdictions is to prevent future lockdowns and restrictions.

Despite evidence that vaccination improves economic and social problems caused by the pandemic, vaccine passports are controversial and have raised scientific, ethical and legal concerns.  Critics have also argued that vaccine passports violate civil liberties via coercion. In the United States, there is no vaccine passport at a federal level, and some US states have preemptively banned vaccine passports in certain public and private sector contexts, citing discrimination and privacy concerns. England initially decided against mandating vaccine passports due to worries that discrimination and economic harm would occur, but later joined the other nations of the United Kingdom in mandating vaccine passports due to the threat of the Omicron variant.

History and background 

Many governments including Finland, and Germany, expressed early interest in the concept. Vaccine passports were seen as a potential way to permit a faster economic recovery from large-scale lockdowns that apply to all residents (especially within the travel and tourism industries), improve the confidence of patrons concerned for their health and safety, and to incentivize vaccination in order for a population to potentially reach "herd immunity".

In May 2020, Chile started issuing "release certificates" to patients who had recovered from COVID-19, but "the documents will not yet certify immunity". Many governments including Finland, Germany, the United Kingdom, and the United States expressed interest in the concept.

The Royal Society published a report on 19 February 2021 where a lead author of the report, Professor Melinda Mills, Director of the Leverhulme Centre for Demographic Science at the University of Oxford said: “Understanding what a vaccine passport could be used for is a fundamental question – is it literally a passport to allow international travel or could it be used domestically to allow holders greater freedoms?  The intended use will have significant implications across a wide range of legal and ethical issues that need to be fully explored and could inadvertently discriminate or exacerbate existing inequalities.” The report lists 12 essential criteria for an international standard.

On 12 March 2021, Ecma International announced its intention to create an international standard which prevents counterfeits and protects private data as much as possible in a "Call for Participation on Vaccine Passports International Standardization"  that referenced the earlier report from the UK's Royal Society. In August 2021, Ecma International announced revisions to Ecma-417 (Architectures for distributed real-time access systems) relevant to standards for vaccine passports.

An early advocate of immunity passports during the COVID-19 pandemic was Sam Rainsy, the Cambodian opposition leader. In exile and under confinement in Paris, he proposed immunity passports as a way to help restart the economy in a series of articles which he began in March 2020 and published in The Geopolitics and The Brussels Times. The proposals were also published in French. The idea became increasingly relevant as evidence of lasting acquired immunity became clear.

Proponents of the idea such as Sam Rainsy, co-founder of the opposition Cambodia National Rescue Party (CNRP) have argued that immunity, whether acquired naturally or through vaccination, is a resource which needs to be used to limit the impact of the pandemic on the global economy. Many people in Cambodia depend entirely for their living on a tourism industry which has been wiped out. Poor countries can also benefit from recording immunological status as this will reduce wastage of scarce vaccines. The immunity passport proposed by Rainsy was effectively adopted in the EU under the name of "health pass".

 it was not yet clear whether vaccinated people that remain asymptomatic are still contagious and are thus silent spreaders of the virus putting unvaccinated people at risk. "A lot of people are thinking that once they get vaccinated, they’re not going to have to wear masks anymore," said Michal Tal, an immunologist at Stanford University. "It’s really going to be critical for them to know if they have to keep wearing masks, because they could still be contagious."

In January 2021, Israel announced that Israelis who had received their second vaccination and those who had proof of recovery from infection would be eligible for a Green Pass, exempting them from isolation requirements and mandatory COVID-19 tests, including those on arrival from overseas. In February 2021, Israel became one of the first countries to implement a vaccine passport system, dubbed the Green Pass. They are required in order to access venues such as gyms, hotels, bars, and restaurants. In October 2021, Israel announced an update to its guidelines, requiring that the most recent vaccine dose (or proof of recovery) to have been during the past six months.  This change made Israel the first country to make a booster shot a requirement for its vaccine passport system.

By region

Africa

Morocco 

In August 2021, Morocco established a nightly curfew between 23:00 and 04:30, exempting those fully vaccinated. The curfew was lifted in November 2021.

Asia

Azerbaijan 

Azerbaijan requires proof of vaccination for people over 18 to enter virtually all public spaces. This policy began on 1 September 2021. A federal mandate has also required all state-regulated workers to be vaccinated as of 1 October 2021.

China 

In February 2020, China started to use digital "health codes", available on a variety of platforms including WeChat and Alipay with scannable QR barcodes displaying a "traffic light" system of colours to enter public transport, shops, restaurants and malls. It was used 40 billion times between February and March.

In March 2021, an "International Travel Health Certificate" was created. In March 2021, the government of China rolled out the world's first COVID-19 vaccine passport system through a partnership with Alipay and WeChat. The system provides a health certificate that includes an individual's vaccine status and the results of COVID-19 testing. Initially, the system would only indicate that an individual had been vaccinated if they received a Chinese-made coronavirus vaccine, leading to criticism, though by April 2021 the system began to accept records of receiving the Pfizer-BioNTech, Moderna, and Janssen vaccines. As of March 2021, the app was optional and its use was restricted to Chinese citizens. The digital health passport is intended to better facilitate travel. Privacy advocates and Chinese netizens have expressed concerns regarding the potential invasive data collection and the use of data for non-health monitoring purposes.

Iran 
According to Minister of health and education requires passport number, Iranian national ID card code for issuing vaccine digital foreign travel card.

Israel 

Israel was one of the first countries to issue what is known as a Green Pass in February 2021. The pass was discontinued on 1 June 2021, but following a surge of new infections, it was reinstated on 29 July 2021. In October 2021, all existing Green Passes were voided if the most recent shot was administered more than 6 months ago. A new pass would be issued upon proof of a third (booster) dose or a recovery within the past 6 months. A temporary Green Pass could also be obtained with a negative viral test, but must be paid for by the individual unless ineligible for vaccination. Starting 1 March 2022, most COVID-19 regulations were relaxed, and a Green Pass is now only required to enter old age homes.

Japan 

On 19 July 2021, Japan began accepting applications for its COVID-19 vaccination passport program. When issued, the passports will be in paper form in both Japanese and English, showing the holder's date(s) of inoculation and the vaccine type, and are available free of charge. As of 22 July 2021, Japan vaccine passport holders are exempt from entry restrictions in Austria, Bulgaria, Italy, Poland, and Turkey. South Korea will also exempt those travelling for specific business, academic, or humanitarian reasons. Entry is also facilitated by Germany; Honduras; Hong Kong; Lithuania; St. Kitts and Nevis; St. Vincent and the Grenadines; and Thailand's islands of Phuket, Samui, Ko Pha-Ngan, and Ko Tao. Japan is in negotiation with other countries (including China and the United States) to accept the passport.

Saudi Arabia 

Residents attending restaurants, cafes and public spaces like malls, shopping centres and markets must be fully vaccinated. The country uses the Tawakkalna app which includes information for health appointments, vaccination status and alerts users to COVID-19 exposure for contact tracing purposes.

Singapore 

Since 10 August 2021, all residents dining out must be fully vaccinated by showing proof of vaccination using the TraceTogether or HealthHub app, or use the TraceTogether token. Proof of vaccination has been progressively implemented in almost all public venues since 13 October 2021, starting with shopping malls, retail shops, entertainment venues except bars, nightclubs and karaoke parlours, attractions, cruises and eateries. It has since been expanded to include large events, public libraries, selected events at community buildings and will be expanded to tertiary institutions, places of lodging, small events and workplaces from January 2022.

South Korea 

On 1 November 2021, a vaccine passport system went into effect in South Korea as part of a "living with COVID-19" strategy. Residents wishing to access high-risk areas such as bars, restaurants, gyms and saunas must be vaccinated. All COVID-19 restrictions are planned to end in February 2022.

Taiwan 

On 25 October 2021, the Taiwanese government announced that the digital COVID certificate system in the country had been completed. In December 2021, the system was also recognised by the EU as an equivalent of the EU Digital Covid Certificate. On 20 January 2022, Taiwan officially released the certificate and implemented rules that it be required before entering bars or karaoke alike.

Europe

European Union 

The European Union offers an EU Digital COVID Certificate (EUDCC), also known as the Green Pass, a digitally-signed proof of vaccination, proof of a recent recovery, or a recent negative test, for use when travelling within the Schengen area with fewer restrictions.

Bulgaria 

On 19 October 2021, the caretaker Minister of Health of Bulgaria, Stoycho Katsarov, introduced the Green Certificate (Bulgarian: Зелен Сертификат). Since 21 October 2021, all visitors to cinemas, theaters, concerts, museums, galleries, supermarkets over 300 square meters, fitness centers, gyms, restaurants and entertainment centers in Bulgaria have to prove that they are vaccinated, have a valid negative test from last 72 hours or have been ill recently. The restrictions ended on 10 March 2022.

Denmark 

Denmark introduced a Coronapas on 21 April 2021. Those unvaccinated with a recently negative test of 72 hours or previous infection of COVID-19 of up to 12 weeks prior were included in the pass system. Due to the high uptake of vaccines, Denmark retired their system on 10 September 2021.

France 

France issued a Health Pass (or Pass Sanitaire in French) on 9 August 2021, for use in non-essential settings for those 18 and older. To obtain the pass people must be fully vaccinated or undertake a test within 72 hours of attending a non-essential space or have recovered recently from an infection of the virus. The initial announcement of the pass system is believed to have encouraged an additional one million people to sign up for vaccination the day following the announcement, and is credited to encouraging a further 3.7 million people to sign up for vaccination in the following week.  Starting 1 October 2021, those age 12 and older will require a Pass Sanitaire to enter public sites like restaurants, cinemas, and sporting events.

Germany 

In Germany, proof of COVID vaccinations or recent recovery, is typically entered in the International Certificate of Vaccination or Prophylaxis, similar to how other vaccinations for other diseases are recorded. The entry in this booklet can be used to acquire an EU Digital COVID Certificate, in accordance with EU Directive 2021/953, effective 1 July 2021.

Hungary 
Outside of the application of the EUDCC, Hungary recognises Kazakh and Indian vaccine passports.

Ireland 

In July 2021, Ireland introduced a vaccine certificate program (EU Digital COVID Certificate) which allowed vaccinated individuals to attend cafes, bars and restaurants. Due to one of the highest uptakes of COVID-19 vaccines in the world, the Republic of Ireland (but not Northern Ireland) had plans to retire their vaccine passport program on 22 October 2021 however this was postponed due to increased COVID-19 cases and hospital numbers. On 22 January 2022, the Republic of Ireland's vaccine passport programme was retired, except for international travel.

Italy 

In August 2021 the Italian government extended the requirement of the EU Digital COVID Certificate, also known as a Green Pass, to the participation in sports events and music festivals, but also to access to indoor places like bars, restaurants and gyms, as well as to long-distance public transportation. On 15 October 2021, Italy became the first country in the world to require its entire workforce, public and private, to have a government-issued health pass.

Sweden 
On 1 December 2021 the Swedish government introduced vaccine passports for indoor events with more than 100 people. Indoor events with more than 100 participants who do not use vaccination certificates must follow specific guidelines to avoid spreading the disease.

Ukraine 

In Ukraine, citizens with at least one dose of a vaccine are allowed to attend certain high-risk indoor settings which would normally be closed or heavily restricted in hot spots.

United Kingdom 

Proof of vaccination programs exist in the Home Nations of the United Kingdom, with England and Wales referring to them as "NHS COVID Pass", Scotland as "NHS Scotland Covid Status", and Northern Ireland as "COVIDCert NI". By December 2021, all four nations had mandated proof of vaccination or a recent negative test in specific settings. The exact rules vary by nation, but they primarily applied to venues such as cinemas, nightclubs, and venues hosting large organized events (including but not limited to concerts and sporting events).

In September 2021, Secretary of Health Sajid Javid stated that England would not implement a mandate for proof of vaccination, following pushback from Conservative members of parliament and business leaders over potential discrimination and economic harm. Prime Minister Boris Johnson subsequently stated that England would focus on a strategy of contact tracing, rapid testing, and the rollout of vaccine boosters, and only included mandatory proof of vaccination in a package of "plan B" measures (including a reintroduction of mask mandates) in the event of another surge of COVID-19 cases. The spread of Omicron variant in England would lead to the implementation of "plan B", resulting in proof of vaccination for nightclubs and large events becoming mandatory beginning 15 December. These restrictions ended on 27 January 2022.

North Macedonia 

Residents wishing to attend events, bars, restaurants, and other dining establishments must present proof of vaccination.

North America

Canada 

The implementation of digital proof of vaccination in Canada has largely been conducted at the provincial and territorial level, with the federal government specifying a standard document and QR code designed to be suitable for international travel.

As of November 2021, all ten provinces in Canada, and two of the three territories, had implemented or announced plans to implement a provincially-regulated vaccine passport.

Federal requirements and mandates 

Beginning 30 October 2021 proof of vaccination became mandatory for all passengers aged 12 and older boarding domestic and/or international commercial airplanes departing from most Canada-based airports, and those riding on the cross-country Via Rail services.

Travellers by land (via the United States border) are required to be fully vaccinated to enter Canada and must provide a negative test 72-hours before land crossing. An exception was made for essential workers, until January 15, 2022 when essential workers (mainly truckers) were required to be fully vaccinated to re-enter the country. In late-January 2022, a convoy to and demonstration in the federal capital of Ottawa—supported primarily by far-right activists and groups—was held to protest this change.

Alberta 
Alberta implemented the Restrictions Exemption Program (REP) from 20 September 2021 to 8 February 2022, after re-establishing a state of emergency on 15 September 2021. The government described the program as an opt-in system, allowing establishments to operate with fewer restrictions. Visitors at these establishments were required to present a proof of vaccination or a recent negative test. If a facility does not participate, or is prohibited from participating, it was required to comply with all public health orders, such as reduced capacity and/or being prohibited from offering indoor dining. 

Due to Omicron variant, even establishments participating in REP became subject to restrictions in December 2021, including restrictions on the capacity of large venues (50%), and restaurants subject to limits on table sizes, a prohibition on entertainment, and operating hours.

The city of Calgary passed a municipal bylaw on 23 September 2021 to mandate participation in REP by all industries that are eligible to do so. The bylaw ceased on 9 February 2022 due to the lifting of the REP by the provincial government. The city considered reimplementing the mandate at the municipal level (as haveseveral U.S. cities) but such a proposal was rejected by the city council committee.

Manitoba 
Manitoba was the first province to introduce a passport system in Canada on 17 July 2021. The passport requirement was removed for movie theatres, museums and galleries on 7 August 2021, only to be reinstated on 3 September 2021, upon Manitoba expanding its passport system. The province utilized physical Immunization Cards which faced supply shortages in production.

Quebec 
Quebec was the second province to implement a vaccine passport system on 1 September 2021, using QR codes.

Northwest Territories 
The Northwest Territories will implement an opt-in vaccine passport system on 22 October 2021 using original vaccination receipts.

Other provinces 
 British Columbia has created a Proof of vaccination system which utilises a QR code. The system initially relied on paper receipts of the BC vaccine receipt and gradually migrated to a digital system. The QR code can also be physically printed out.
 New Brunswick requires a Proof of Vaccination system using original immunisation records.
 Newfoundland and Labrador has plans to release a QR code based system for their vaccine passport.
 Nova Scotia has a Proof of Full Vaccination Policy using original government issued proof of vaccination.
 Ontario introduced a vaccine passport system on 22 September 2021. The system initially relied on original vaccine paper receipts, but gradually began switching over to verifiable QR codes along with the introduction of the "Verify Ontario" mobile app on 22 October 2021.  As of 4 January 2022, only vaccine receipts with verifiable QR codes and the "Verify Ontario" mobile app will be accepted at venues where proof of vaccine is required.
 Prince Edward Island uses the PEI Vax Pass Program using original government issued vaccination information.
 Saskatchewan has a Proof of vaccination mandate, effective from 1 October 2021 to 13 February 2022.
 Yukon territory will implement a passport system on 30 November 2021 to access non-essential indoor facilities.

United States 

Although the Centers for Disease Control and Prevention (CDC) issues a COVID-19 vaccine card that may be accepted as proof of vaccination (but is vulnerable to forgery and counterfeiting, and thus not a verifiable proof of vaccination), the United States does not have a federal framework for a digital vaccine passport, and federal officials explicitly ruled out doing so, citing privacy and human rights concerns. This leaves their implementations up to individual states and territories.

Prior to the issue becoming politicised, public views on vaccine passports were evenly split and the divide crossed, rather than followed, political and ideological lines. Since then, criticism and conspiracy theories surrounding the vaccines in general, and in turn vaccine mandates, largely came from the political right; for example, U.S. representative for Georgia's 14th congressional district Marjorie Taylor Greene, a Republican, asserted that requesting the disclosure of one's vaccine status was a violation of data privacy rules for the health care industry, even though said rules only apply to entities such as health insurers.

The state governments of California, Hawaii, Louisiana, New York, North Carolina, Delaware, and Virginia have each rolled out mechanisms where residents can choose to receive proof of COVID-19 vaccination in the form of a scannable QR code by linking to records within each state's immunization registry. Illinois has a Vax Verify website, where residents can download proof of COVID-19 vaccination for businesses that require it. In New Jersey, residents can obtain a digital COVID-19 vaccination record through its mobile app Docket; Governor Phil Murphy specifically avoided using the term "vaccine passport" to describe the service.

Each state credential has varying degrees of interoperability with other state and foreign governments; some states have closed systems, with QR codes that are only usable within the issuing state, and others have broad interoperability, with New York offering both types of credentials for its residents. Arizona, Maryland, Mississippi, North Dakota, Washington, West Virginia, Puerto Rico, and the District of Columbia have contracted with the organization MyIR that interfaces with governmental vaccination records to produce a PDF proof of vaccination, but has also moved toward scannable QR codes. Health departments in Indiana, Colorado, and Georgia can provide proof of vaccination in PDF form but not via a QR code.

At least 20 states have prohibited public agencies from issuing or requiring a vaccine passport, while Alabama, Florida, Iowa, Montana, and Texas also made it illegal for any private entity to request proof of vaccination as a condition of service, under the assertion that they discriminate against those who have made a personal choice to not receive the vaccine.

Los Angeles County 
Los Angeles County began a proof of vaccination system for indoor bars, restaurants, venues and nightclubs on 7 October 2021.

New York City 
New York City began its Excelsior Pass or Key to NYC vaccine passport system for dining, fitness, events and indoor entertainment on 13 September 2021.

New Orleans 
New Orleans began to require proof of vaccination or a negative test to enter indoor bars, restaurants, events, fitness, and sporting events on 16 August 2021.

South America

Brazil 

In December 2020, the Brazilian Senate approved a document giving digital proof of all vaccinations – not just those in respect of COVID-19. However, the urgency for creating such a digital proof of vaccination came from the COVID-19 pandemic.

Chile 

In May 2021, then Health Ministry Subsecretary, Paula Daza, mandated the "mobility pass" (pase de movilidad) in gyms, restaurants and swimming pools. This document was given to people with two doses of the COVID-19 vaccine, later it was upscaled to three doses and later on in the same year four doses were required, being one of the most drastic vaccines passports in the world. Chile is the only country in the world with entry procedures such as requiring homologation of vaccines to travel to.

Oceania

New Zealand 

On 17 November 2021, the New Zealand Government launched a vaccine certificate called My Vaccine Pass for individuals who have been vaccinated against COVID-19. The vaccine pass is required to enter hospitality venues, community, sport and faith-based gatherings as defined by the COVID-19 Protection Framework.
They came into force on 29 November 2021. On 23 November, the New Zealand Government launched the NZ Pass Verifier to scan the passes.
On April 5, 2022, vaccine passes will no longer be required for most venues.
On June 1, 2022, all vaccine passes will become invalid, and will no longer be required for any venue.

Arguments and controversy 
As of September 2021, the World Health Organization (WHO) acknowledged that mandatory COVID-19 vaccine passports would be discriminatory against countries with little access to vaccinations, but could eventually be considered for international travel when vaccine access improves.

Effect on vaccine uptake 
In some jurisdictions, vaccine uptake increased after various levels of governments announced plans to mandate their use.

Ethical and social issues 
The ethical issues that arise in the acceptability of vaccine passports revolve around the policy objectives and the intended use. The public health restriction on implementing vaccine passports limits the freedom of an individual to perform social activities.

People who are privileged to receive the vaccination will have gained access to going back to normal life while low-income populations will remain disproportionately low on vaccinations which hinders their ability to participate in non-essential activities.

Due to the imbalance in the distribution of vaccines in the developing world, there are concerns about the inequity of vaccine passports for travellers. On 15 April 2021, the World Health Organization's emergency committee opposed vaccination passports, saying, "States parties are strongly encouraged to acknowledge the potential for requirements of proof of vaccination to deepen inequities and promote differential freedom of movement".

However, many countries may increasingly consider the vaccination status of travellers when deciding to allow them entry or whether to require them to quarantine. "Some sort of vaccine certificate will be important" to reboot travel and tourism, according to Dr. David Nabarro, special envoy on COVID-19 for the WHO, in February 2021.

In March 2021, Bernardo Mariano, the WHO's Director of Digital Health and Innovation, said that "We don't approve the fact that a vaccination passport should be a condition for travel." Lawmakers in several US states are also considering legislation to prohibit COVID-19 vaccination passports.

Ethical concerns about vaccine passports have been raised by Human Rights Watch (HRW). According to HRW, requiring vaccine passports for work or travel could force people into taking tests or risk losing their jobs, create a perverse incentive for people to intentionally infect themselves to acquire immunity certificates, and risk creating a black market of forged or otherwise falsified vaccine cards.

By restricting social, civic, and economic activities, vaccine passports may "compound existing gender, race, ethnicity, and nationality inequities." Immunity certificates also face privacy and human rights concerns.

Digital privacy 
A security vulnerability in the app used by New Jersey and Utah briefly made it possible to request the QR codes of other users, containing encoded name, date of birth, and vaccination history information. On 24 September 2021, Saskatchewan Health Authority stated that digital vaccine records obtained in the province between 19 and 24 September may have accidentally contained the wrong QR code for the specific user.

Vaccination certificates

Natural immunity 
People may acquire a degree of natural immunity from SARS-CoV-2 when they are exposed to the live virus, and develop a primary immune response which produces antibodies that can recognize specific variants. As of May 2021, the WHO reported that more than 90% of individuals established recognizable antibodies within four weeks after an infection. For most people, these detectable antibodies roughly stay for at least 6–8 months. However, antibodies may not guarantee immunity from novel variants and mutations of SARS-CoV-2. The uncertainty of the science behind immunity to SARS-CoV-2 has raised issues over their applicability within passport frameworks.

It has been argued that the primary difference is that vaccination certificates such as the Carte Jaune incentivize individuals to obtain vaccination against a disease, while immunity passports incentivize individuals to get infected with and recover from a disease.

See also 
 COVID-19 vaccine card
 COVID-19 vaccine
 Deployment of COVID-19 vaccines
 Electronic health record
 Living with COVID-19
 Patient record access
 Vaccination requirements for international travel

References 

Responses to the COVID-19 pandemic
Passports
Immunology
Software associated with the COVID-19 pandemic